Hardy's Green is a hamlet in civil parish of Birch in the Colchester district, in the county of Essex, England. Nearby settlements include the large town of Colchester.

References

Hamlets in Essex